Rachelle Thiewes (born 1952) is an American jeweler and metal artist based in El Paso, Texas. She was professor of metal arts at the University of Texas at El Paso from 1976 to 2014 and is currently professor emerita.

Biography 
Thiewes was born in Owatonna, Minnesota, and attended a private Catholic school, where she derived some inspirations for her work. She received her BA in Art/Metals from Southern Illinois University, Carbondale, and her MFA in Art/Metals from Kent State University. She also taught a Master class at the Royal College of Art in London in 1995.

Artwork 
In the 1980s Thiewes work was largely focused on making the wearer of her jewelry conscious of their body and incorporated kinetic or moving elements. Her more recent work draws direct inspiration from the landscape and her decades-long experience of her home in the Chihuahuan desert. This is reflected in her choice of color palette but also through her use of reflective metals and auto paint on her jewelry. Recent projects by Thiewes have included collaborations and performance work, such as her collaborative book project Beauty.Chaos and traveling show "Air Patterns" with painter Suzi Davidoff. Her work is displayed in many art collections across the world, including The Metropolitan Museum of Art, The American Craft Museum, The Art Institute of Chicago, The Renwick Gallery at the Smithsonian Institution, The National Museums of Scotland, and the Royal College of Art, London.

References

External links
 Official website

American jewelry designers
American goldsmiths
1952 births
Living people
Southern Illinois University alumni
Kent State University alumni
University of Texas at El Paso faculty
20th-century American women artists
Women metalsmiths
People from Owatonna, Minnesota
American women academics
21st-century American women
Women jewellers